Sultan is a coastal town in the Al Wahat District, Cyrenaica region, in north-eastern Libya.

From 1983 to 1995 and again from 2001 to 2007 it was part of the District of Ajdabiya.

References

External links
Satellite map at Maplandia.com

Port cities and towns in Libya
Populated places in Al Wahat District
Cyrenaica